Christopher "Chris" Beaumont (born Melbourne, 1961), is an Australian still life painter, influenced by Spanish masters of the early 17th century particularly Juan Sánchez Cotán and Francisco de Zurbarán.

He typically works in oil paint on linen painting common vegetables or other market produce often with a dark background and modernist, post-modern elements. His paintings are in many institutional, corporate and private collections and he has had studios in various parts of Melbourne particularly St Kilda.

Biography 
In 1983 Beaumont studied for a MB., BS. degree from the University of Melbourne (1983). In 1984, he also received a diploma in Art and Design from the Prahran College of Advanced Education, taking life drawing and painting classes with Howard Arkley. He graduated with a BFA in Painting & Sculpture from the Victorian College of the Arts in 1987. Furthermore, he holds a Graduate Diploma in Multimedia Software Development from the Swinburne University of Technology.

In 1988 he participated in the large group exhibition "Site of Execution" at the Australian Centre for Contemporary Art. In 1989 he was a finalist in the prestigious Moet et Chandon Touring Exhibition prize, was acquired by the Margaret Stewart Endowment for the National Gallery of Victoria, joined Bruce Pollard's Pinacotheca Gallery in Richmond and travelled to Europe: Amsterdam, Athens, Taormina, Naples, Rome and Paris. Bruce Pollard retired a few years later and he joined the Botanical gallery directed by Sue Corlett in South Yarra. The gallery later became Scope gallery when it moved to Brunswick Street, Fitzroy.

In 1994 he shared the Conrad Jupiter's Gold Coast City Art Prize with Guan Wei. That same year he was invited to exhibit with Eva Breuer in Woollarhra, New South Wales.

In 1997 Christopher and Rita Arrigo were married as Italians in Taormina, Sicily. He has returned to Italy to travel extensively and see Howard Arkley's exhibition at the Venice Biennale in 1999 and to attend the Vernisage week of the Venice Biennale in 2011 and 2015

He participates in many Australian art exhibitions, and won multiple awards. In 2004, he was finalist in The Arthur Guy Memorial Painting Prize and won the People’s Choice winner of the Arthur Guy Memorial Painting Prize, Bendigo Art Gallery. This involved a solo exhibition which was staged in 2006 at The Bendigo Art Gallery followed by a solo exhibition at Eva Breuer's gallery later that year.

In 2014 he was invited by Fortyfivedownstairs in Flinders Lane, Melbourne to be Artist in Residence and staged an exhibition of paintings commissioned across the previous two decades alongside new works produced during the residency.

External links 
 
 Christopher Beaumont, all about Art Schools

References 

Australian still life painters
Victorian College of the Arts alumni
Swinburne University of Technology alumni
Artists from Melbourne
1961 births
Living people